Ball Lightning is a 1979 Czechoslovak comedy film. The screenplay was written by Zdeněk Svěrák, Ladislav Smoljak and Zdeněk Podskalský and the film was directed by Smoljak and Podskalský.

External links 
 

1979 comedy films
1979 films
Czechoslovak comedy films
Films directed by Ladislav Smoljak
Films directed by Zdeněk Podskalský
Films set in Prague
Films with screenplays by Zdeněk Svěrák
Czech comedy films
1970s Czech films